Favez is a rock band from Lausanne, Switzerland.
On their first three albums (prior to 1997) they were called Favez Disciples, after a figure from the movie Le Mans with Steve McQueen

Current lineup
As of 2007, their lineup is:
Chris Wicky — vocals, guitar
Guy Borel — guitar
Yvan Lechef — bass guitar
Fabrice Marguerat — drums
Maude Oswald - Hammond
Jeff Albelda - Rhodes, piano

Discography
Always Satisfied (1992) 
And the World Don't Care (1993) 
Arrogance (1995) 
The Eloquence of the Favez Disciples (1997) 
A Sad Ride on the Line Again (1999) 
Gentlemen Start Your Engines (2000) 
From Lausanne, Switzerland (2002) 
Bellefontaine Avenue (2003) 
Old and Strong in the Modern Times (2005)
Bigger Mountains Higher Flags (2007)En Garde!'' (2011)

External links
Official website
[ Short biography] from Allmusic
Interview and live video snippets at wenn's rockt! WebTV

Swiss indie rock groups
Doghouse Records artists